Pegasus is the name of a wooden roller coaster located at Mt. Olympus Water & Theme Park in Wisconsin Dells, Wisconsin.  The trains were built by the Philadelphia Toboggan Company.

Track layout
Pegasus travels over and around Little Titans's drop.

Roller coasters in Wisconsin
Roller coasters introduced in 1996